A Tenant Panel is an organisation proposed by the British Coalition government to facilitate local residents exercising control over their environment.

Grant Shapps, the UK Housing Minister has engaged the National Tenant Organisation -  a consortium of the Confederation of Co-operative Housing, the Tenant Participation Advisory Service, the National Federation of Tenant Management Organisations and the Tenants’ and Residents’ Organisations of England - to develop a framework for these panels.

References

Neighborhood associations